"Gimme the Light" is the first single from Jamaican dancehall musician Sean Paul's second studio album, Dutty Rock (2002). The song was originally released in Jamaica in 2001 as "Give Me the Light" and was issued internationally in 2002. "Gimme the Light" was Paul's first hit single, peaking at number seven on the US Billboard Hot 100 and becoming a top-20 hit in Canada, the Netherlands, and the United Kingdom. It is the most popular hit single from the "Buzz" riddim, which was the debut hit production for Troyton Rami & Roger Mackenzie a production duo of Black Shadow Records in Miami, Florida.

Background and release
In 2001, a fledgling Miami-based Jamaican production team known as Black Shadow created a new dancehall riddim which they called "The Buzz". Of approximately 12 tracks that were vocalized by the latest stars and upcoming artists of dancehall, four of them became hits in the following year: Elephant Man's "Haters Wanna War", Cobra's "Press Trigger", Sizzla's "Pump Up", and Sean Paul's "Give Me the Light", which became the most popular one because of its catchy chorus. "The Buzz" became the biggest Dancehall riddim of 2002, followed by the Diwali riddim by Steven "Lenky" Marsden later on, which was also his first hit production. Black Shadow followed up "The Buzz" with the "Surprise" riddim in 2003.

The unedited version of "Gimme the Light", as is the case with many Sean Paul releases, makes direct reference to smoking marijuana (in this case, passing along hydroponically grown marijuana, referred to as "the 'dro" in the song's chorus). The edited version of "Dutty Rock" contains the lyrics "Just gimme the light and start the show," instead of "pass the dro." Paul is also out clubbing and checking out women for a possible nightcap. References to marijuana were removed from the song for the edited version.

The official remix, "Gimme the Light (Pass the Dro-Voisier Remix)", features rapper Busta Rhymes. This version uses only the chorus from the original (the clean version also uses the unedited version's chorus), replaced by new lyrics from Paul and Busta, also of Jamaican heritage. The remix's name is referenced from Busta Rhymes' 2002 hit single, "Pass The Courvoisier, Part II". The song's instrumental was used for the remainder of the remix of Sean Paul's next single, "Get Busy", featuring Fatman Scoop.

The song was included on Billboard's 12 Best Dancehall & Reggaeton Choruses of the 21st Century at number three.

Track listings
CD maxi – US
 "Gimme the Light" (Buzz Riddim)
 "Gimme the Light" (Buzz Riddim instrumental)
 "Can You Do the Work" (Liquid Riddim)

CD maxi – Europe
 "Gimme the Light" (album version) – 3:46
 "Gimme the Light" (Pass the Dro-Vosier remix) – 3:20
 "Gimme the Light" (blackout remix) – 3:42
 "Gimme the Light" (2Step Moabit relick remix) – 3:47

CD single
 "Gimme the Light" (clean radio edit) – 3:47
 "Gimme the Light" (Pass the Dro-Voisier remix - clean radio edit) – 3:20

12-inch maxi – US
 "Gimme the Light" (original mix) – 3:46
 "Gimme the Light" (instrumental version) – 2:50
 "Gimme the Light" (Pass the Dro-Vosier remix - album / street mix) – 3:20
 "Gimme the Light" (Pass the Dro-Vosier remix - clean radio edit) – 3:20

12-inch maxi – Europe
 "Gimme the Light" (original mix) – 3:46
 "Gimme the Light" (Pass the Dro-Vosier remix) – 3:20
 "Gimme the Light" (heartless crew remix) – 4:45
 "Gimme the Light" (heartless crew dub) – 4:45

CD maxi – Remixes
 "Gimme the Light" (Pass the Dro-Vosier remix - clean radio edit) – 3:20
 "Gimme the Light" (original mix - clean "Start the Show" radio edit) – 3:47
 "Gimme the Light" (Pass the Dro-Vosier remix - album / street version) – 3:20
 "Gimme the Light" (original mix - album version) – 3:46
 "Gimme the Light" (instrumental version) – 2:49

Charts

Weekly charts

Year-end charts

Certifications

Release history

References

Sean Paul songs
2002 singles
Music videos directed by Director X
Songs about cannabis
Songs written by Sean Paul